Nathalie Tauziat won the first edition of the tournament, defeating Katerina Maleeva 6–4, 6–1 in the final.

Seeds

Draw

Finals

Top half

Bottom half

References
Main Draw and Qualifying Draw

Challenge Bell
Tournoi de Québec
Can